Tuffy Tire & Auto Service Centers is a chain of franchise and company-owned automotive service centers headquartered in Toledo, Ohio. As of March 2018 there were 175 locations in 20 states in the eastern United States.The company is owned by the Tuffy Associates Corporation until 2021 when Mavis Tire, Inc. purchased the franchise. Tuffy was founded in 1970 by Charles Amy as a muffler shop, but later diversified into complete automotive repair and tire service centers.

References

External links
 Tuffy Tire & Auto Service Centers
 Tuffy Tire & Auto Service Centers Franchise Opportunities

American companies established in 1970
Retail companies established in 1970
Automotive repair shops of the United States
Companies based in Toledo, Ohio